Garoolgan is the location of a closed railway station and silo on the Temora- Roto railway line in the Riverina of New South Wales, Australia. A passenger station was located at the site between 1916 and 1975. The line remains open for goods traffic.

References

Towns in the Riverina
Towns in New South Wales